The 2020 Auburn Tigers football team represented Auburn University in the 2020 NCAA Division I FBS football season. The Tigers played their home games at Jordan–Hare Stadium in Auburn, Alabama, and competed in the Western Division of the Southeastern Conference (SEC). They were led by eighth-year head coach Gus Malzahn until his dismissal at the end of the regular season. The team's spring game, originally intended to be played on April 11, 2020, was canceled due to the COVID-19 pandemic. The Tiger's regular-season schedule was also impacted as all non-conference games were canceled and the SEC allowed teams to play 10 in-conference games only.

On December 13, 2020, head coach Gus Malzahn was fired after eight years. After reaching the 2014 BCS National Championship Game at the end of the 2013 season, Auburn won at least 10 games under Malzahn only once more, in 2017. Kevin Steele, defensive coordinator, was designated to serve as the Tigers' interim coach for the Citrus Bowl.
In December 2020, Bryan Harsin was hired as head coach.

SEC Media Days 
In the preseason media poll, Auburn was predicted to finish in third place in the West Division.

Schedule
Auburn announced its 2020 football schedule on August 7, 2019. The 2020 schedule originally consisted of 7 home, 4 away, and 1 neutral game in the regular season.

The Tigers had games scheduled against Alcorn State, North Carolina, Southern Miss, and UMass, which were canceled due to the COVID-19 pandemic. In July, the SEC announced the non-conference games would be canceled and only ten conference games would only be played.

The game between Auburn and Mississippi State was postponed due to an outbreak of COVID-19 on the Mississippi State team.  The game was originally scheduled for November 14.
Schedule Source:

Game summaries

Kentucky

at Georgia

Arkansas

at South Carolina

at Ole Miss

LSU

Tennessee

at Alabama

Texas A&M

at Mississippi State

vs. Northwestern (Citrus Bowl)

Rankings

Players drafted into the NFL

References

Auburn
Auburn Tigers football seasons
Auburn Tigers football